Sri Dubba Rajeshwara Swamy Devasthanam is a Hindu temple in the village of Pembatla, Sarangapur mandal, Karimnagar District, Telangana, India.

This temple of Lord Siva, in the form of Dubba Rajeshwara Swamy, is very famous in this part of the region. It is one of the oldest temples in Karimnagar District. Maha Shivaratri is the biggest festival at the temple. Other festivals include:
 Sri Krishna janmastami
 Dasara
 Bathukamma
 Vinakaya chaturthi
 Sri Rama Navami
 Sri Anjaneya swamy jayanthi.
 Deepavali
 and many more.

Pembatla Dubba Rajeshwara temple is situated 8 km from Jagtial and 57 km from Karimnagar, Telangana. TSRTC provides special buses on the occasion of the Mahasivarathri jathara from Jagtial to the temple.

References

External links

 Special buses for Mahasivaratri
 Sivaratri festivals in Karimnagar
 List of Siva Temples in Telangana and Andhra Pradesh

Hindu temples in Karimnagar district
Shiva temples in Telangana